Kim Min-seok (Korean: 김민석, born 29 May 1964) is a South Korean activist, educator and politician. He was the Member of the National Assembly for Yeongdeungpo 2nd constituency from 1996 to 2002.

Born in Seoul, Kim has degrees from Seoul National University, Columbia University, Harvard University, Tsinghua University and Rutgers University – New Brunswick. He was detained for occupying the American Culture Centre in Seoul. He was elected to the National Assembly in the 1996 election. He was one of rising stars of the Democrats but fell down when he competed as the Mayor of Seoul in the 2002 local elections but lost to Lee Myung-bak who later became the President of the Republic. He was not able to make a comeback, until he was elected again as the MP for Yeongdeungpo 2nd in the 2020 election.

Early life 
Kim Min-seok was born in Seoul in 1964, the youngest of three children born to Kim Joo-wan and Kim Choon-ok. His oldest brother, Kim Min-woong, is the Pastor of Gillbott Church in River Edge, New Jersey, United States. His second eldest brother, Kim Min-hwa, died in 1987 due to a traffic collision.

He attended Soongsil High School and studied sociology at Seoul National University. In 1982, his brother Kim Min-woong went to the United States to study political science at the University of Delaware but soon changed his mind to be a pastor. However, he led a reunification movement at there and therefore was unable to return to South Korea till 2002 due to the breach of the National Security Act. 3 years later, Kim Min-seok was elected the President of the Student Council at his university but was sentenced to 5 years and 6 months in jail for leading the American Culture Centre occupation case. He was released on 27 February 1988 after being pardoned by the newly-elected President Roh Tae-woo. Following his detention, his mother Kim Choon-ok established the Council for the Movement of Families for the Fulfillment of Democracy, a pro-democracy organisation. Ms Kim visited his oldest son in 1999, until then she could not make it as the Embassy of the United States refused her application for visa due to her youngest son's activist career.

In 1987, Ms Kim lost his second son, Kim Min-hwa. At the hospital mortuary, Kim Dae-jung, who later became the country's president, visited her. Around that period, Kim Min-seok himself could also be closer to the future President.

Politics

Early years 
Kim started his political career in 1990 when he joined the Democratic Party, known as the Little Democrats, led by Lee Ki-taek. He, therefore, did not share a same party with Kim Dae-jung, who led the Peace Democratic Party (PDP) at that time, till both the PDP and the Little Democrats were merged and re-founded as the Democratic Party in 1991.

Prior to the 1992 election, Kim was nominated the Democratic candidate for Yeongdeungpo 2nd constituency by the co-Presidents, Kim Dae-jung and Lee Ki-taek. He faced off against the former Deputy Prime Minister and the ruling Democratic Liberal Party (DLP) nominee Rha Woong-bae but lost to the DLP candidate by a margin of 260 votes. He demanded a recount but the margin was slightly widened for 25 votes.

Following the defeat, Kim moved to the United States for obtaining 2 master's degrees — one in international politics at Columbia University and the other in public administration at John F. Kennedy School of Government of Harvard University. He returned to South Korea prior to the 1995 local elections where he helped his party's nominee for the Mayor of Seoul Cho Soon. He attracted the youth votes and Cho was elected to the position.

Parliamentary career 
In the 1996 election, Kim was nominated the candidate of the National Congress for New Politics (NCNP) for Yeongdeungpo 2nd and faced off with Choi Young-han, an actor, broadcaster and the nominee of the ruling New Korea Party (NKP). He contested under the slogan, "Kim to the Parliament, Choi to the Stage (김민석을 국회로, 최불암은 무대로)". He successfully defeated the famous actor; being just 32 years old, he was the youngest MP as well as the opposition candidate received the highest votes in Seoul.

He gained public attention during the hearing of Hanbo Group in 1997, held due to its CEO Jeong Tae-soo who was implicated in various corruption cases. Though he could not receive any replies from the CEO Jeong, he proved that the testimonies of Jeong was widely manipulated. From this event, he was called as "The Hearing Star (청문회 스타)" by many people.

In the end of 1999 when the NCNP was on the way to re-establish as the Millennium Democratic Party (MDP), he served as the Spokesperson of the Preparatory Committee. He also established his own organisation named Youth Korea in order to expand the supports. On 29 October, he was selected as one of the "20 Asian Youth Leader of the Millennium" by Asiaweek, a Hong Kong-based English news magazine, along with Choo Mi-ae. In January 2000, he was again chosen as one of the "100 Global Leaders in 2000" by the World Economic Forum (WEF).

Kim was re-elected in the 2000 election, but his MDP and the coalition partner, the Alliance of Liberal Democrats (ALDE), fell short of a majority. Nevertheless, on 17 May 2000, he and some other MPs provoked a controversy due to the Millennial NHK incident, when they went to a karaoke bar named Millennial NHK after the eve memorial ceremony of the Gwangju Uprising. He was also criticised in the end of year when he denounced the party's minority wing and supported the majority wing for the party's reform.

2002 mayoral election 
Prior to the 2002 presidential election, Kim was the second most popular candidate within the MDP. In a survey of Sisa Journal in November 1999, he was selected as the best future leader of the 21st century. He, instead, made a decision to stand for the Mayor of Seoul, as he was ineligible to run for presidential election due to the age restrictions; being just 38 years old, any presidential candidates must be at least 40 years old.

For the 2002 local election, the MDP was planning to nominate the then Mayor Goh Kun as its candidate, but he declared to not seek for re-election. Should Goh would not stand, Kim was one of the "new faces" of the party, along with Choo Mi-ae. On 25 February 2002, he announced he would participate for the MDP preselection. On 2 April, he received 52.1% and defeated Lee Sang-su.

He ran under 2 slogans, "The new era needs a new leader" and "New start, now the quality of life". He promised eco-friendly manifestos i.e. adopting natural gas bus, stricter air pollution control and so on. In addition, he planned his mayorship would be "predictable".

Kim faced off against the GNP candidate, Lee Myung-bak, who later became the President. Despite the early lead, many polls showed that the supports between 2 candidates were neck and neck. When the campaign was officially begun, some supporters worried if Kim lost to Lee due to the low turnout. On 13 June, amid the 2002 FIFA World Cup and the corruption scandal of the President's sons, Kim only received 43.02% and came behind to Lee (52.28%). His constituency, in which he resigned in order to participate for the mayoral election, was taken over by the GNP candidate Kwon Yeong-se.

Downfall 
On 17 October 2002, Kim announced his departure from the MDP and participation to the Council for a Unity Candidate, where its members had withdrawn their supports to the MDP candidate Roh Moo-hyun and backed the National Unity 21 candidate Chung Mong-joon. His decision was harshly criticised in publics, including the other MDP MPs i.e. Im Jong-seok. Because of his action, he was given a nickname "migratory bird (철새)", a term refers to politicians who like to change their minds or party memberships for their own benefit. In later interview, he rued his decision.

Since then, his political career fell down and could not make any comeback. In the 2004 election, Kim ran for Yeongdeungpo 1st to return as an MP, but amid the impeachment of the President Roh Moo-hyun, the MDP's support was plummeted. Kim, also came behind of Goh Jin-hwa and Kim Myung-seop. Just after a month, he was arrested for a corruption allegation that he had provoked during the 2002 local elections. He was sentenced to 8 months in jail with a stay of execution for 4 years. Due to this, his bid for the 2008 election was refused by the United Democratic Party (UDP). Despite of his election as the Vice President at the 6 July leadership election, he was again arrested in the end of year for corruption allegations. In May 2010, he contested the Democratic preselection for Busan mayorship while he was amid a trial, but was defeated by Kim Chŏng-gil. 3 months later, he was sentenced a 6-million-won (≒ 6,000 US$) fine and was prohibited from politics for 5 years.

In 2014, Kim joined as the consultant of the newly-formed Democratic Party, known as the Extra-parliamentary Democrats aka Democratic (K). On 30 January 2016, he was elected the co-Presidents of the party, along with the former Governor of South Jeolla Park Joon-young. For the 2016 election, he ran 2nd in his party list but was not elected as the party did not pass the 3% threshold. In September, the party announced its merger into the Democratic Party of Korea (DPK).

Comeback 
On 16 January 2020, Kim declared his candidacy for Yeongdeungpo 2nd in the 2020 election. From his declaration, he said that he is supposed to restart from his home constituency although he still had opportunities to run for other constituencies. He participated the DPK preselection and defeated the incumbent Sin Kyŏng-min. Ironically, Sin became the first incumbent MP lost at DPK preselection.

During the election campaign, Kim contested under the slogan, "Make Yeongdeungpo as Ildeungpo (영등포를 일등포로 만들겠습니다)"; the word ildeung means the "1st place" in Korean. He pledged to restore Daebangcheon, which was inspired from a manifesto of Lee Myung-bak (to restore Chunggyecheon) whom he used to face off against 18 years ago.

In the exit poll on 15 April, Kim came behind to the United Future candidate Park Yong-chan (Kim: 46.9%, Park: 48.3%). Nevertheless, the official result showed that Kim received 50.2% and defeated Park with a majority of 5.9%.

Personal life 
Kim Min-seok was first married to Kim Ja-young, a newsreader known for World Trend Music, whom he met at a coffee shop at the new wing of Korean Broadcasting System (KBS) in June 1992. The couple married on 6 March 1993 and had a son and a daughter. On the other hand, since 2010s, both couple were rumoured that they were experiencing a discord till being separated. Both of them denied, however, in March 2015, the couple was reported they had already divorced in December 2014.

On 24 November 2019, Kim posted on his Facebook that he would remarry on 12 December. He remarried Lee Tae-rin at Shinghil Church.

Election results

General elections

Local elections

Mayor of Seoul

References

External links 
 Official website

1964 births
Living people
Seoul National University alumni
Rutgers University alumni
Columbia University alumni
Tsinghua University alumni
Harvard Kennedy School alumni
Minjoo Party of Korea politicians
Gim clan of Gyeongju
People from Seoul